The Pittsburg Diamonds were a minor league baseball team that operated from 1948 to 1951 as part of the Class-D Far West League. They were based in Pittsburg, California. For a brief time in 1948 they moved to Roseville, California and played as the Roseville Diamonds.

External links
 Baseball Reference

Defunct Far West League teams
Defunct baseball teams in California
Professional baseball teams in California
New York Giants minor league affiliates
Defunct minor league baseball teams
1948 establishments in California
1951 disestablishments in California
Baseball teams established in 1948
Sports clubs disestablished in 1951
Pittsburg, California
Baseball teams disestablished in 1951
Far West League teams